Bessin is an area in Normandy, France, corresponding to the territory of the Bajocasses, a Gallic tribe from whom Bayeux, its main town, takes its name.

History
The territory was annexed by the count of Rouen in 924.

The Bessin corresponds to the former diocese of Bayeux, which was incorporated into the Calvados département following the French Revolution.

Ecology
Part of the Bessin is now administered as a national park for its importance as marshland.

Geography of Calvados (department)
Former provinces of France